U. nepalensis may refer to:

 Ulmus nepalensis, a flowering plant
 Uncothedon nepalensis, a clearwing moth
 Uropoda nepalensis, a mite with a single pair of spiracles positioned laterally on the body
 Utricularia nepalensis, a carnivorous plant